Mohamed Mourtada (born 18 March 1930) is a Lebanese weightlifter. He competed in the men's middleweight event at the 1960 Summer Olympics.

References

1930 births
Living people
Lebanese male weightlifters
Olympic weightlifters of Lebanon
Weightlifters at the 1960 Summer Olympics
20th-century Lebanese people